The 2013–14 season was Olympique Lyonnais's 64th professional season since its creation in 1950. The club competed in Ligue 1, finishing fifth, the Coupe de France, the Coupe de la Ligue, the UEFA Champions League, and the UEFA Europa League.

Squad

First-team squad
As of 2 September 2013.

Out on loan

Reserve squad

Competitions

Season overview

Ligue 1

League table

Results summary

Results by round

Matches

Coupe de France

Coupe de la Ligue

UEFA Champions League

Third qualifying round

Play-off round

UEFA Europa League

Group stage

Knockout phase

Round of 32

Round of 16

Quarter-finals

Statistics

Goalscorers

Clean sheets

References

Olympique Lyonnais seasons
Lyon